Bamboo is a group of woody perennial plants in the true grass family Poaceae. In the tribe Bambuseae also known as bamboo, there are 91 genera and over 1,000 species. The size of bamboo varies from small annuals to giant timber bamboo.  Bamboo evolved only 30 to 40 million years ago, after the demise of the dinosaurs.

Bamboo species can be divided into clumping (sympodial) and running (monopodial) species.  Clumping species grow from the soil in a slowly expanding tuft.  Running species send underground rhizomes to produce shoots several metres from the parent plant.

All Chinese names for bamboo contain the character "竹". This character by itself simply means bamboo, however it enters into hundreds of other words and phrases. "Every day our written language reminds us of the antiquity of China's partnership with bamboo." (Dr. W. Y. Hsiung). This character, pronounced zhu depicts two leafed twigs of bamboo.

Species

References

External links

Species
Bamboo
Bamboo
Bamboo
Bamboos, List
Bamboos, List
Bamboos, List
Bamboos, List
Bamboos, List
Bamboos, List
Articles containing video clips